Thomas Kent Norment Jr. (born April 12, 1946) is an American politician serving as the Minority Leader of the Senate of Virginia. He has served in the Virginia General Assembly since 1992. A Republican, he represents the 3rd district of the Virginia Senate, which includes parts of  the Virginia Peninsula, plus King and Queen County, King William County, New Kent County, and Gloucester County on the Middle Peninsula.

Background
Norment graduated from the Virginia Military Institute and received his J.D. degree from William and Mary School of Law.

Norment is an adjunct professor of law at William and Mary Law School. He served as on-campus attorney, and counselor and attorney to the president of William and Mary.

In 2008, Norment requested an opinion from Attorney General Bob McDonnell that "at no time will I assume a relationship of 'attorney-client' that would result in the exercising of any attorney client privilege or any work product privilege. It is my understanding the College would continue to rely upon legal services through the Office of Attorney General." McDonnell concluded, "it is my opinion that you do not have an impermissible conflict of interest under the Act based on the facts herein", writing, "I affirm the intention that your relationship with the College will not be that of attorney and client."

Attorney General Ken Cuccinelli released the Norment opinion to the public and issued a press release on September 2, 2011. The press release read: "Recent public statements made by state Senator Thomas Norment suggest that for the past several years, he assumed a role of legal counsel for the College of William & Mary. One of his reported statements also incorrectly implied that a 2008 opinion he requested from the Office of the Attorney General affirmed that such an arrangement would be acceptable under the law."

Political career
Initially a Democrat, Norment was elected to the James City County Board of Supervisors as a Republican and served from 1987 to 1991. He was elected to the state senate in 1991, defeating Democrat Bill Fears with 54% of the vote. Norment was unopposed for reelection in 1995, reelected with 63% of the vote in 1999, reelected with 62% of the vote in 2003, reelected unopposed in 2007 and 2011, and reelected with 70% of the vote in 2015. He has led the Virginia Senate Republican caucus since 2008.

Controversies
In January 2001, Norment was charged with driving under the influence after he was pulled over on Interstate 64 outside Richmond with a blood alcohol content of 0.10. He apologized to his constituents and colleagues from the Senate floor two days later, saying, "I offer no excuses, no avoidances of responsibility. I do, however, offer my sincere and contrite apologies for any embarrassment or shadow I may have cast over the integrity and dignity of this body."

In April 2015, a 2013 letter from Norment to the Virginia State Bar saying that he had previously had an extramarital relationship with a female lobbyist was made public. Norment was responding to allegations from an unsatisfied legal client, Christopher Burruss, who attempted to extort him by revealing Norment's affair. Rather than comply with Burruss's demands, Norment turned the evidence over to the State Bar. Burruss was convicted of extortion and sentenced to two years in prison. Norment reported that his marriage had recovered from the affair, but he later divorced. The lobbyist's name, Angie Bezik, was withheld from news reports until 2018, when Norment announced he was engaged to marry her. He restricted press access to the Virginia Senate in 2016, a move seen as catalyzed by the coverage of his affair.

In August 2015, Norment's name and personal information appeared on the hacked Ashley Madison servers, showing one payment of $68.99 and two payments of $79. Clients of the dating service were required to pay to initiate a conversation with another client, and male clients paid to read the first messages from female clients. Norment declined to comment.

In 2019, former students of Norment's at William and Mary accused him of teaching racist material and making racist and transphobic statements in class.

In February 2019, it was revealed that Norment was an editor of the 1968 Virginia Military Institute yearbook that showed students in Ku Klux Klan attire and blackface and with racially offensive nicknames, which came to light in the context of the 2019 Virginia political crisis. Norment does not appear in the photos and issued a statement saying he condemned the use of blackface and said his role was ensuring writers and photographers made their submissions on time and that he was "still culpable, but it is by association with a team that produced that yearbook with those photos". He pointed out that page 236 of the same yearbook shows he supported VMI's racial integration in 1968, and that he led an effort to enroll women there in 1997.

Notes

References

Tommy Norment; Virginia Senate (constituent website)

External links

|-

|-

|-

|-

|-

1946 births
20th-century American lawyers
20th-century American politicians
21st-century American lawyers
21st-century American politicians
College of William & Mary faculty
Lawyers from Richmond, Virginia
Living people
People from James City County, Virginia
Politicians from Richmond, Virginia
Republican Party Virginia state senators
Virginia lawyers
Virginia Military Institute alumni
William & Mary Law School alumni